Coovadia is a surname. Notable people with the surname include:

Hoosen Coovadia (born 1940), South African doctor
Imraan Coovadia (born 1970), South African novelist, essayist, and academic